Onur is a common Turkish given name. In Turkish, "Onur" means "Honour" or Pride. Its origin comes from Latin "honor, honōrem", most resembling the word Onore in Italian.

Onur may refer to:

Given name
 Onur Tuna, Turkish actor
 Onur Saylak, Turkish actor, filmmaker and director
 Onur Acar, Turkish football player
 Onur Aydın (basketball) (born 1979), Turkish basketball player
 Onur Aydın (footballer) (born 1988), Turkish footballer
 Onur Bayramoğlu, Turkish football player
 Onur Cavit Biriz (born 1998), Turkish windsurfer
 Onur Içli, Turkish football player
 Onur Karakabak, Turkish football player
 Onur Kıvrak, Turkish football player
 Onur Sengul, Turkish bass player

Turkish masculine given names

de:Onur